Mohammad Sozib (1 June 1999 – 15 November 2020) was a Bangladeshi cricketer. He made his List A debut for Shinepukur Cricket Club in the 2017–18 Dhaka Premier Division Cricket League on 5 February 2018. On 15 November 2020, Sozib was found dead, with local police confirming that he had committed suicide.

References

External links
 

1999 births
2020 suicides
Bangladeshi cricketers
Shinepukur Cricket Club cricketers
Place of birth missing
Suicides in Bangladesh
People from Rajshahi District
2020 deaths